Anglo-Prussian alliance may refer to:

 Anglo-Prussian alliance (1756)
 Anglo-Prussian alliance (1788)